Susan H. Lees is an anthropologist and human ecologist, and the former editor-in-chief of Human Ecology and American Anthropologist. She is professor emeritus of cultural anthropology at City University of New York.

Research 
Lees' work focuses on political ecology and anthropology. Her early work was largely focused on irrigation and its impact on agriculture, society, and conflict and relationships between groups. Her research has also explored the impact of climate change, gentrification, and other social developments on rural fishing communities in Maine, particularly crab fishing in Deer Isle, Maine.

In 1976, she became editor of Human Ecology, following the retirement of its founder Andrew P. Vayda. She invited Daniel Bates to co-edit the journal with her.

In 2009, Lees became the editor of American Anthropologist along with Fran Mascia-Lees.

Works 

 ed. Against the Grain: The Vayda Tradition in Human Ecology and Ecological Anthropology. AltaMira Press. 2009.
 The Political Ecology of the Water Crisis In Israel. University Press of America. 1999.
 Case Studies in Human Ecology. Plenum Press. 1998.
 Sociopolitical Aspects of Canal Irrigation in the Valley of Oaxaca. University of Michigan Press. 1973.

References 

Human ecologists
City University of New York faculty
Living people
Year of birth missing (living people)
University of Michigan alumni
American women anthropologists
21st-century American anthropologists
Economic anthropologists
Cultural anthropologists
Social anthropologists